Hayes may refer to:
 Hayes (surname), including a list of people with the name
 Rutherford B. Hayes, 19th president of the United States
 Hayes (given name)

Businesses
 Hayes Brake, an American designer and manufacturer of disc brakes
 Hayes Manufacturing Company, a Canadian manufacturer of heavy trucks
 Hayes Microcomputer Products, an American manufacturer of modems

Football clubs
 A.F.C. Hayes, an English football club in Hayes, Hillingdon
 Hayes F.C., a former English football club in Hayes, Hillingdon
 Hayes & Yeading United F.C., an English football club formed from the merger of Hayes F.C. and Yeading F.C.

Places

United Kingdom
 Hayes, Bromley, London, formerly in Kent
Hayes railway station
 Hayes School
 Hayes, Hillingdon, London, formerly in Middlesex
Hayes & Harlington railway station, historically Hayes station
Hayes Urban District, later known as Hayes and Harlington Urban District
 Hayes, Staffordshire, a location
 Coton Hayes, Stafford borough, Staffordshire
 Heath Hayes, Cannock Chase district, Staffordshire
 The Hayes, a commercial area in Cardiff, Wales

United States
 Hayes, California
 Hayes, Louisiana
 Hayes, South Dakota
 Hayes, Wisconsin
 Hayes County, Nebraska
 Hayes Center, Nebraska, a village 
 Hayes State Park, in Michigan
 Hayes Township (disambiguation)
 Hayes Valley, San Francisco, California
 Hayes Volcano, in Alaska

Elsewhere
 Hayes, Jamaica
 Hayes, Moselle, France
 Hayes Corners, Ontario (disambiguation), several places in Canada
 Hayes Glacier, in Antarctica 
 Hayes Prison Farm, in Tasmania, Australia
 Hayes, Tasmania, Australia
 Hayes River, in Manitoba, Canada, draining into the Hudson Bay
 Hayes River (British Columbia), Canada, entering Teslin Lake
 Presidente Hayes Department, Paraguay
 Lake Hayes, South Island, New Zealand

See also

 Hayes Creek (disambiguation)
 Hayes High School (disambiguation)
 Hayesville (disambiguation)
 Hays (disambiguation)
 Haze (disambiguation)
 Justice Hayes (disambiguation)
 La Haye (disambiguation)
 Hay, cut and dried grass or other plants
 Francesco Hayez (1791–1882), an Italian painter